Georgia Rose was a 1930 film. It was directed by Harry Gant and stars Clarence Brooks. It followed the 1928 film Absent with Brooks as its star.

The film was produced by Aristo Film Corporation and the songwriter was Fred C. Washington. The film was the first film talkie actress and singer Evelyn Preer appeared in.

Plot 

The film is about an African American family migrating north.
This picture was filmed by Harry Gant, former cameraman with the Lincoln Motion Picture Company. This story is about a minister's attempt to move his flock and daughter from Georgia to better farming land in the Midwest. While boarding up with a family, the minister's daughter is smitten by the love bug and led to corruption by her new lover's brother. Of course, she is saved in the nick of time by her new lover and forgiven by her father.

Cast

 Clarence Brooks as Ralph
 Irene Wilson as Rose
 Evelyn Preer as Grace
 Roberta Hyson as Helen
 Allegretti Anderson (née Alegretta Summers; 1898–1944) as Ethel
 Edward Thompson as Bob
 Webb King as Joe
 Spencer Williams as Ezra
 Dora Dean Johnson as Mary Barnett
 E. C. Dyer as Reverend Hoskins

Reception 
The film received coverage from the Baltimore Afro-American, California Eagle, Chicago Whip, New York Age, and Pittsburgh Courier. Henry Louis Gates described the film as a race musical.

References

External links 

1930 films
American musical films
African-American films
1930s American films